Donald Benjamin Lurio, better known by his stage name of Don Lurio (15 November 1929, in New York City – 26 January 2003, in Rome) was an American-born Jewish Italian dancer, choreographer and TV presenter for RAI, the Italian radio and television public service.

Biography
Born in the United States in a family of Italian Jewish origin, Lurio operated a dance studio on Broadway theatre with Bob Fosse and Jack Cole. In 1957 the group toured Europe and Lurio decided to settle in Italy. He appeared in several Italian films and TV shows in the 1960s and 1970s. He also appeared in a handful of British films. He choreographed the interval act for the Eurovision Song Contest 1970 with his ensemble, The Don Lurio Dancers. One of his most popular number, the song Testa, Spalla (Head, Shoulder), was premiered on the show Hai visto mai? in 1973 when performed in a duet with showgirl Lola Falana.

Openly gay (which was considered scandalous at the time, and not only in Italy), Lurio had a long-term relationship with Livio Costagli, who died in 1994 at the age of 44 years from complications caused by AIDS.

Lurio died in Rome in 2003 from respiratory failure. As his will, the National Academy of Dance in Rome has a grant named after him.

Selected filmography
 Casinò de Paris (1957)
 Rocco e le sorelle (1961) 
 Pugni pupe e marinai (1961) 
 Toto's First Night (1962)
 Canzoni a tempo di twist (1962) 
 Il magnifico Bobo (1967)
 "FF.SS." - Cioè: "...che mi hai portato a fare sopra a Posillipo se non mi vuoi più bene?" (1982)
 Arrivano i miei (1982)
 Quo vadiz? (1984)
 The Fish in Love (1999)

References

External links 
 

1929 births
2003 deaths
American male dancers
Italian male dancers
American choreographers
Italian choreographers
American television hosts
Italian television presenters
American people of Italian descent
American emigrants to Italy
20th-century American dancers
20th-century Italian dancers
Gay Jews
American LGBT entertainers
Italian LGBT entertainers
Gay dancers
LGBT choreographers
Respiratory disease deaths in Lazio
Deaths from respiratory failure